The Cappadocian Fathers, also traditionally known as the Three Cappadocians, are Basil the Great (330–379), who was bishop of Caesarea; Basil's younger brother Gregory of Nyssa (c. 335 – c. 395), who was bishop of Nyssa; and a close friend, Gregory of Nazianzus (329–389), who became Patriarch of Constantinople. The Cappadocia region, in modern-day Turkey, was an early site of Christian activity, with several missions by Paul in this region.

The Cappadocians advanced the development of early Christian theology, for example the doctrine of the Trinity, and are highly respected as saints in both Western and Eastern churches.

Biographical background 
An older sister of Basil and Gregory of Nyssa, Macrina, converted the family's estate into a monastic community. Basil the Great was the oldest of Macrina's brothers, the second eldest being the famous Christian jurist Naucratius. Another brother, Peter of Sebaste, also became a bishop. Their maternal grandfather had been a martyr, and their parents, Basil the Elder and Emmelia of Caesarea are also recognized as saints.

Theological contributions 

The fathers set out to demonstrate that Christians could hold their own in conversations with learned Greek-speaking intellectuals and that Christian faith, while it was against many of the ideas of Plato and Aristotle (and other Greek philosophers), was an almost scientific and distinctive movement with the healing of the soul of man and his union with God at its center—one best represented by monasticism. They made major contributions to the definition of the Trinity finalized at the First Council of Constantinople in 381 and the final version of the Nicene Creed, finalised there.

They made key contributions to the doctrine of the Trinity and to the responses to Arianism and Apollinarianism.

Subsequent to the First Council of Nicea, Arianism did not simply disappear.  The Council of Nicea had asserted that the Son was of the same substance (homoousios) as the Father.  The semi-Arians taught that the Son is of like substance with the Father (homoiousios) as against the outright Arians who taught that the Son was not like the Father, but had been created, and was therefore not God.  So the Son was held to be like the Father but not of the same essence as the Father.

The Cappadocians worked to bring these semi-Arians back to the orthodox cause.  In their writings they made extensive use of the (now orthodox) formula "one substance (ousia) in three persons (hypostaseis)". The relationship is understandable, argued Basil of Caesarea, in a parallel drawn from Platonism: any three human beings are each individual persons and all share a common universal, their humanity. The formulation explicitly acknowledged a distinction between the Father, the Son and the Holy Spirit (a distinction that Nicea had been accused of blurring), but at the same time insisting on their essential unity.

Thus Basil wrote:

In a brief statement, I shall say that essence (ousia) is related to person (hypostasis) as the general to the particular. Each one of us partakes of existence because he shares in ousia while because of his individual properties he is A or B. So, in the case in question, ousia refers to the general conception, like goodness, godhead, or such notions, while hypostasis is observed in the special properties of fatherhood, sonship, and sanctifying power. If then they speak of persons without hypostasis they are talking nonsense, ex hypothesi; but if they admit that the person exists in real hypostasis, as they do acknowledge, let them so number them as to preserve the principles of the homoousion in the unity of the godhead, and proclaim their reverent acknowledgment of Father, Son, and Holy Spirit, in the complete and perfect hypostasis of each person so named. —Epistle 214.4.

Basil thus attempted to do justice to the doctrinal definitions of Nicea while at the same time distinguishing the Nicene position from modalism, which had been Arius's original charge against Pope Alexander in the Nicene controversy.  The outcome was that Arianism and semi-Arianism virtually disappeared from the church.

The Cappadocians held a higher view of women than many of their contemporaries. Some scholars suggest that Macrina was an equal in the group, and therefore ought to be recognized as "The Fourth Cappadocian."

While the Cappadocians shared many traits, each one exhibited particular strengths. Scholars note that Basil was "the man of action", Gregory of Nazianzus "the orator" and Gregory of Nyssa "the thinker".

See also 
 Amphilochius of Iconium
 Peter of Sebaste
 Three Holy Hierarchs: Basil of Caesarea, Gregory of Nazianzus and John Chrysostom.

References 

 Cappadocian
4th-century Christian saints
Christianity and Hellenistic philosophy
Cappadocia (Roman province)
Byzantine Cappadocians
Christian terminology
Groups of Roman Catholic saints
Groups of Christian saints
Cappadocian Greeks